Erwin Mortier (born 28 November 1965) is a Dutch-language Belgian author. Spending his youth in Hansbeke, he later moved to nearby Ghent, where he became city poet (2005–2006).

He wrote as a columnist for newspapers like De Morgen and published several novels:
 Marcel (1999)  – 
 My Fellow Skin – 
 Shutter Speed  – 
 While the Gods Were Sleeping (2008)

Collections of his poetry were published from 2001 on.

Among the literary prizes awarded to Mortier there are debut prizes in Belgium and in the Netherlands for Marcel, in 2002 the C. Buddingh' prize for his debut in poetry, and in 2009 the AKO Literatuurprijs for While the Gods Were Sleeping.

Mortier came out of the closet with A plea for sinning, a collection of essays (2003). Other non-fiction included Evenings on the Estate: Travelling with Gerard Reve (2007), and A farewell to Congo: Back to the equator with Jef Geeraerts (2010).

He translated war prose by Ellen N. La Motte, Mary Borden and Enid Bagnold in Dutch, and produced the first Dutch translation of Virginia Woolf's Between the Acts.

References

External links

 Author's website (Partly in English)
 "Under the skin of an awkward awakening" book review of My Fellow Skin by Kathleen Marshall, in Scotland on Sunday, 2 November 2003
 "Memories made flesh" by AS Byatt in The Guardian, 22 November 2003 (on My Fellow Skin)
 Shutterspeed cover art and synopsis
 "While the Gods Were Sleeping" at OverDrive.com
 
 A Letter to the lad I used to be - Online Essay by Erwin Mortier at Upcoming4.me

1965 births
Living people
Belgian non-fiction writers
Belgian male novelists
20th-century Belgian novelists
21st-century Belgian novelists
Flemish poets
Gay poets
Gay novelists
War writers
Belgian gay writers
Belgian LGBT poets
Belgian LGBT novelists
20th-century Belgian male writers
21st-century Belgian male writers
C. Buddingh' Prize winners
Male non-fiction writers